The Captiva 35 is an American sailboat that was designed by Walter Scott as a cruiser and first built in 1980.

The Captiva 35 design was developed into the Allmand 35 in 1981.

Production
The design was built starting in 1980 by Captiva Yachts of Clearwater, Florida and later by Sovereign Yachts of Port Richey, Florida, both in the United States, but it is now out of production.

Design
The Captiva 35 is a recreational keelboat, built predominantly of fiberglass, with wood trim. It has a masthead sloop with aluminum spars, a raked stem, a reverse transom, a skeg-mounted rudder controlled by a wheel and a fixed fin keel. It displaces  and carries  of ballast.

The design has sleeping accommodation for seven people in three cabins. There is a bow cabin with a "V"-berth, a "U"-shaped dinette in the main cabin that forms a double berth, plus a main cabin single settee berth, and aft cabin with a double berth. The galley is located on the starboard side just forward of the companionway ladder. A navigation station is opposite the galley, on the port side. The head is located just aft of the bow cabin on the port side and includes a shower. The fresh water tank has a capacity of 

See also
List of sailing boat types

References

Keelboats
1980s sailboat type designs
Sailing yachts
Sailboat type designs by Walter Scott
Sailboat types built by Captiva Yachts
Sailboat types built by Sovereign Yachts